Highway 3 is a major provincial paved undivided highway in the Canadian province of Saskatchewan. It runs from the Alberta border, where it continues west as Alberta Highway 45, to the Manitoba border, and then continues east as Highway 77. Highway 3 is about 615 km (382 mi.) long. The CanAm Highway comprises  Saskatchewan Highways 35, 39, 6, 3, as well as 2.   of Saskatchewan Highway 3 contribute to the CanAm Highway between Melfort and Prince Albert.

Major communities that Highway 3 passes through are Prince Albert, Melfort, and Tisdale.

Travel route
Travel continues west as Alberta Highway 45 at the Alberta – Saskatchewan border. Ttrembling aspen (Populus tremuloides) form bluffs (small islands or shelter belts) which are typical in this area. This area also marks the northernmost area of the Missouri Coteau which has produced the Thickwood Hills feature here. Reverend Lloyd and Isaac Montgomery Barr lead the Barr colonists here to Brittania in the early 20th century.

Hwy 3 proceeds east just to the south of the North Saskatchewan River. Travel proceeds to the north east from here. Hwy 797 north provides access to Frenchman Butte and the Fort Pitt Provincial Historical Park off Hwy 3. There is still evidence of the North-West Rebellion, Battle of Frenchman's Butte when the Cree and Major General T.B. Strange met on May 28, 1885 here. Paradise Hill, a village of about 500 people, had post office names of LeClair, Diggs and Archie before adopting the moniker Paradise Hill officially for the hamlet in 1928. Oil and gas plants provide the main employment to the area, followed by agriculture and farm machinery dealerships. A red river cart and ox statue are seen at the outskirts of the village commemorating the Carlton Trail which passed through this area en route between Fort Edmonton, and Fort Garry. The Trans Canada Trail is a walking or hiking trail crossing Canada and it makes its way here as well.

 later is the junction with Hwy 21 north, the location of the Frenchman Butte No. 501 RM office.  The Bronson provincial forest to the north provides incoming traffic during the fall hunting season. Cattle farming predominates the area, supplemented by grain crops and the oil & gas industry.  Hwy 21 forms a  concurrency with Hwy 3.  Traveling north on Hwy 26 provides access to St. Walburg and Makwa Lake Provincial Park and Steele Narrow Provincial Historic Park.  Hwy 3 turn at the junction with Hwy 26 continuing south east. At the south east end of the  concurrency  of Hwy 3 and Hwy 26 is the village of Spruce Lake and the junction with Hwy 796 west.  The ecoregion has changed to boreal transition.  Mixed wood boreal forest with jack pine, trembling aspen, white spruce, and tamarack (Larix laricina) furnish the forestry industry.

Turtleford is a town at the junction of Hwy 3 and Hwy 26 and is located along the Turtle River. In 1983, Turtleford became a town with 500 residents, and built the nation's largest turtle. Hwy 3 arrived in Turtleford from the north west and takes a V turn and leaves to the north east.

Glaslyn is located south east at the Hwy 4 concurrency. The concurrency is  along the north east side of the village. The main economy of Glaslyn and area are agriculture, forestry, ecotourism, fishing, hunting and trapping. Glaslyn was a Welsh community which originally settled on the Meadow Lake – Battleford Trail. Turtle Lake,  Meadow Lake Provincial Park and Jackfish Provincial Park are all popular destinations near this access point. After Glaslyn the highway continues on its route to the south east. Cater and Belbutte area both unincorporated areas within Medstead rural municipality (RM).

The town of Spiritwood is in an agricultural community based in the north – central parkland area. Grain growing, ranching and tourism increase the traffic here. Mildred is a small unincorporated area which belongs to Spiritwood RM.
The physiographic region is within the Saskatchewan plains region, more specifically the Saskatchewan River plain.  The features include deep, terraced river valleys, as well as hillocky glacial debris.  The RM of Canwood provides civic governance to Hawkeye, and Ordale, both located just north of Hwy 3.  Shellbrook  is located southwest of Shell Brook, at the junction of Hwy 240 and Hwy 3.

Crutwell is a part of Shellbrook No. 493 RM south of the Hwy 55 – Hwy 3 concurrency. The city of Prince Albert, Gateway to the north, is the third largest in the province and is located on the banks of the North Saskatchewan River. Highways 55, 302, 2 and 3 all meet here. Agriculture, forestry, mining, and tourism are the largest employers in this sector. This city is centrally located along the highway demarks the transition area between the shield boreal forest to the north and the prairie agricultural lands in the south benefiting from the best of both vegetative regions.

Muskoday First Nation has reserved for itself the 9,686.8 hectare (23,936.6 acres) through which Hwy 3 travels from north west to south east.  The South Saskatchewan River divides the reserve almost in half from north to south and also intersects with Hwy 3. Departure from the reserve is due south along Hwy 3. The town of Birch Hills, A Tradition of Pride and Prosperity, is located at the junction of Hwy 25 south west. Travel from Birch Hills continues due east.  Brancepeth is north of Hwy 3, a small hamlet of Birch Hills No. 460 RM.  At the junction with Hwy 778, Hwy 3 turns south east.  Kinistino, a town of 649, is located at the junction of Hwy 778.  The Fort à la Corne Provincial Forest and the confluence of the North and South Saskatchewan Rivers are both located within the RM of Kinistino.  SCAPEthe Study of Cultural Adaptations in the Prairie Ecozoneis studying the Forks of the Saskatchewan River area and Fort-à-la-Corne lands.  The "Changing Opportunities & Challenges: Human-Environment Interaction in the Canadian Prairies Ecozone" program is delving into the archeology, ethnohistory, geomatics, geoarcheology, paleobotany, soil science, and oral traditions of the area.  The village of Beatty, first named Stoney Creek, is located at the junction of Hwy 368.

The City of Northern Lights, Melfort is home to 5,192. The Agriculture Melfort Research Station is centered here along with many other agriculturally based industries. The Tiger Hills Uplands ecozone provides rich soil to grow a diversity of crops. Hwy 3 continues due east from Melfort. The town of Star City is north of the Hwy 681 junction. The village of Valparaiso, one of the few Spanish settlements of the province is just north of Hwy 3. The town of Tisdale, is surrounded by lakes Barrier Lake, Marean Lake, Tobin Lake, and Greenwater Lake Provincial Park. Agriculture and manufacturing are the dominant industries in the area. Besides the major provincial highways 35 and Hwy 3, both the Canadian National Railway (CNR) and the Canadian Pacific Railway (CPR) serve this town. Over 11,000 vehicles per day travel the two highways through Tisdale.

Hwy 3 continues due east until the junction with Hwy 23 at the hamlet of Crooked River. At the end of the concurrency Hwy 3 continues due east. Mistatim a village which is Proud of its Past ..... and Planning for its Future, has an economy based on agricultural mixed farming, hunting trapping and forestry. Mistatim is located south of the Pasquia Forest Reserve, and north of the Porcupine Forest Reserve. The EDEN Regional Economic Development Authority (REDA) encourages tourism, investment, economic and recreational activities in the area.

Hwy 3 continues south east from Mistatim for  then turns due east for  when there is a short stretch traveling north east. Prairie River of the Porcupine No. 395 RM lies to the north of this stretch of highway. Hwy 3 traveling east arrives at the junction of Hwy 9 at Hudson Bay. Hudson Bay is Moose Capital of the World due to the high presence of western moose (Alces alces anderson). At this site were a Hudson's Bay Company Upper Red Deer post, North West Company Upper Red Deer  post. The Rendek Elm Forest is located north and the Hudson Bay Regional Park is located south of Hwy 3. Forestry is a main concern of the area served by Wizewood – MacMillan Bloedel – Weyerhaeuser for years. The highway continues east as Highway 77 after the Manitoba – Saskatchewan border.

Other information
The time zone in Saskatchewan uses Central Standard Time which is different from the time zone of Alberta which combines Mountain Daylight Time or (Central Standard Time) with daylight saving time.

CanAm Highway
The North American Free Trade Agreement NAFTA super corridor CanAm Highway travels along U.S. Route 85 connecting Mexico to Canada. The CanAm highway in Canada comprises Saskatchewan Highways 35, 39, 6, 3, and 2. The route designated as CanAm in the 1920s continues south in Mexico as Mexican Federal Highway 45, and north as SK 102 but are not labeled the CanAm highway.

Major intersections
From west to east:

See also

 List of Saskatchewan provincial highways

References

External links

Saskatchewan Highways Website
Abandoned Farm along Highway 3 Abandoned Places Canada Photographs of Abandoned Buildings & Homesteads in Canada.
Saskatchewan Highway Sign
Saskatchewan Road Trip Highway 3 Westbound Highway 20 to Highway 40 Photographed

003
Transport in Prince Albert, Saskatchewan